The Past is a Foreign Country may refer to:

"The past is a foreign country", the opening phrase of The Go-Between by L. P. Hartley, 1953
The Past is a Foreign Country, a 1985 book by David Lowenthal
The Past is a Foreign Country (Il passato è una terra straniera), a book by Gianrico Carofiglio, 2004
The Past Is a Foreign Land, an Italian film of 2008 based on the Carofiglio novel
The Past is a Foreign Country, a South Korean film of 2008

See also
The Past is Another Country (disambiguation)